Boana semilineata is a species of frog in the family Hylidae that is endemic to Brazil. Its natural habitats are subtropical or tropical moist lowland forests, subtropical or tropical moist shrubland, freshwater lakes, freshwater marshes, intermittent freshwater marshes, pastureland, heavily degraded former forests, water storage areas, and ponds.

References

Boana
Endemic fauna of Brazil
Amphibians described in 1824
Taxonomy articles created by Polbot